Captain Royal Leonard (April 3, 1905 – June 21, 1962), was a Texan pilot who previously flew for TWA between 1935–1941. He was first the personal pilot of Chang Hsueh-Liang, and then that of Chiang Kai-shek.
He was born on April 3, 1905 in Wisconsin.

In 1935 Leonard was first to fly the new Gee Bee Q.E.D. in the Bendix Race. However, Leonard was forced to land in Wichita, Kansas due to engine troubles.

In 1942, he published an autobiography called I Flew for China.

He died on June 21, 1962 in Los Angeles, California at age 57.

Legacy
In 2011, Barry S. Martin published a book titled Forgotten Aviator: The Adventures of Royal Leonard.

References

External links
From the book's back cover:
OUT OF WAR-TORN SKIES, A LEGENDARY PILOT IS BORN

Royal Leonard at China National Aviation Corporation

American aviators
1905 births
1962 deaths